Piparpur may refer to:

Places
 Piparpur, Bhadar, a village in Amethi district of Uttar Pradesh, India
 Piparpur railway station
 Piparpur, Bhetua, a village in Amethi district of Uttar Pradesh, India